A Bundorf analysis is a measure of the characteristics of a vehicle that govern its understeer balance. The understeer is measured in units of degrees of additional yaw per g of lateral acceleration.

An imaginary example

Hence the total under-steer is 11.0 deg/g minus 6.9 deg/g, or 4.1 deg/g. 

Negative values are over-steering, positive values are under-steering, for that axle. If the under-steer contribution of the rear axle is greater than that of the front axle you get negative under-steer, which is known as oversteer. The analysis is only applicable while the parameters remain constant, and thus only up to about 0.4 g.

Explanation of terms

Load transfer effect and cornering stiffness of tire.  As load transfers across the vehicle the tire's ability to provide cornering force for a given slip angle changes. The latter is known as the cornering stiffness of the tire. See also Tire load sensitivity

Aligning torque.  The tire does not just generate a lateral force, it generates a torque as well. This tends to rotate the vehicle as a whole.

Roll camber.  As the vehicle rolls the kinematics of the suspension provide a change in the camber of the tire. This generates a force known as camber thrust.

Roll steer.  As the vehicle rolls the kinematics of the suspension provide a change in the steer angle of the tire. This generates a cornering force in the normal way.

Fy compliance steer.  The lateral force at the contact patch causes the wheel to rotate about the steer axis, generating a steer angle.

SAT compliance steer.  The aligning torque directly twists the wheel on the compliances in the suspension, generating a steer angle.

Under-steer.  In this case, the tendency for an axle or vehicle to turn outwards from a corner.

See also
Vehicle dynamics

References

Bundorf, R.T. and Leffert, R.L. (1976) 'Cornering compliance concept for description of vehicle. directional control properties', SAE paper 760713

Automotive safety
Automotive steering technologies
Automotive suspension technologies